Durham Academy refer to:

Durham Academy, North Carolina, an independent school in Durham, North Carolina, United States
Durham Academy, Ushaw Moor, a secondary school in Ushaw Moor, County Durham, England

See also
Durham (disambiguation)